The Napetipi River is a salmon river in the Côte-Nord region of Quebec, Canada. It empties into the Gulf of Saint Lawrence.

Location

The river's Strahler number is 5.
Along most of its length it flows between high rocky shores.

The mouth of the river is in the municipality of Saint-Augustin in Le Golfe-du-Saint-Laurent Regional County Municipality.
It provides little shelter from southerly winds.

Name

The name Napetipi is Innu in origin and means "river of man". 
Some authors suggest the Saint-Jacques River, mentioned by Jacques Cartier during his first voyage in 1534, was the Napetipi River and bay.
In his 1890 report on the Napetipi River, surveyor Henry Robertson mentions that "there are many seals in Napetipi Lake".

Description

The Dictionnaire des rivières et lacs de la province de Québec (1914) says,

Basin

It lies between the basins of the Chécatica River to the west and the Saint-Paul River to the east.
About  or 4.7% of the watershed is in Labrador.
The Quebec portion is partly in the unorganized territory of Petit-Mécatina and partly in the municipalities of Saint-Augustin and Bonne-Espérance.

Environment

A map of the ecological regions of Quebec shows the Napetipi River in sub-regions 6o-T, 6n-T and 6m-T of the east spruce/moss subdomain.
85.4% of the watershed is forested, and 3.5% has other forms of dry land vegetation. 8.3% is water covered, and 1.2% is wetlands.
The river basin include part of the proposed Basses Collines du Lac Guernesé Biodiversity Reserve.
The biodiversity reserve would protect that part of the river from hydroelectric development.
The basin is home to mammals such as black bear, moose, wolf, American mink and red fox.

Fishing

The Napetipi River is recognized as an Atlantic salmon river.
The waters are cool, and salmon are unusually energetic.
Other fish are anadromous brook trout and brown trout.
The Napetipi River Outfiters has exclusive rights, located on the shore of Lake Pareme, north-west of Lake Napetipi.
They recommend the release of all catches.
The river had exceeded its target for salmon management, and in July 2018 the Ministry of Forests, Wildlife and Parks announced that in August anglers could keep their catch of one large salmon  or longer in the Gros Mécatina, Napetipi, Saint-Paul, Vieux Fort and Matapedia rivers.

Notes

Sources

Rivers of Côte-Nord